Italians Marco Cecchinato and Matteo Viola were the defending champions, but they did not participate this year.

Andrej Martin and Hans Podlipnik-Castillo won the tournament, defeating Alexandru-Daniel Carpen and Dino Marcan in the final, 7–5, 1–6, [10–8].

Seeds

Draw

External links
 Main Draw

Challenger Pulcra Lachiter Biella - Doubles